Ranjan Pramod is an Indian screenwriter and director best known for his work in Malayalam cinema. He made his debut as a writer with Randam Bhavam (2001). His popular films include Meesa Madhavan (2002), Manassinakkare (2003), Achuvinte Amma (2005), and Naran (2005), all of them being blockbuster hits. He directed the film Rakshadhikari Baiju Oppu which received positive reviews and was declared Super Hit. It Also Won him the Kerala State Film Award for " Best Film with Popular Appeal and Aesthetic Value" for 2017.

Career
Pramod started his career through the movie Randam Bhavam (2001) directed by Lal Jose. He scripted a variety of commercial successes and well-acclaimed movies including Meesa Madhavan (2002), Manassinakkare (2003), Achuvinte Amma (2005), and Naran (2005). He has directed three movies, Photographer (2006), Rose Guitarinal(2013)
and Rakshaadhikari Baiju Oppu (2017) which was a major comeback from Ranjan Pramod in his directorial career. After 10 years, Pramod returned to scriptwriting in Ennum Eppozhum starring Mohanlal and Manju Warrier.

Filmography

References

External links

21st-century Indian film directors
Indian male screenwriters
Living people
Year of birth missing (living people)
Malayalam film directors